The Parchim-class corvette, Soviet designation Project 1331M, was developed for the East German Navy in the late 1970s, and built by the Wolgast Peene-Werft. The ships were designed for coastal anti-submarine warfare. In case of an all-out NATO-Warsaw Pact war in Europe their prime targets would have been the small U-206 coastal submarines of the West German navy. The first ship, Wismar (now the Indonesian KRI Sutanto), was launched on 9 April 1981 in Rostock, and subsequently another 15 ships were built until 1986. To make production more economical, the Soviet Union agreed to purchase another 12 ships from Wolgaster Peenewerft built between 1986 and 1990, thereby effectively subsidising the East German shipbuilding industry.

The ships of the Soviet Navy were named Parchim II by NATO. Though useful as a coastal ASW platform, the Soviet production of the similar but far more powerful  made this purchase even more illogical for the Soviet Navy. After German re-unification, some of the former East German ships were used briefly by the unified Germany Navy before all of them were sold to the Indonesian Navy in 1993. The Indonesian Navy extensively refurbished their Parchims, to the point where the refurbishing exceeded the cost of purchase. They are still in service, both in the Indonesian Navy and in the Russian Baltic Fleet.

Construction 

The Parchims were built to replace the obsolete HAI III-class subhunters of the Volksmarine. Because of their displacement, over 800 tons in full load, they were able to leave coastal waters, even in rough weather. Propulsion consisted of three Soviet-designed M 504 56-cylinder diesel engines, a development of the M 503 A fast attack craft engine. The middle engine provided power to a variable-pitch propeller for cruising speed, while the two outer engines served two outer fixed-pitch propellers for boost speed. The ships were constructed with regular (stainless) steel and consisted of ten waterproof compartments.

Weapon systems and sensors

Air defence

For air defence, the ships were equipped with one double-barrel AK-230 30 mm gun and one double-barrel AK-725 57 mm gun. The AK-725 double 57 mm AA gun, designed in 1959, was directed by the ESP-72 fire control system, which received ranging and target bearing information from an MR 103 (NATO codename 'MUFF COB') radar. The MR 103 had a  parabolic radar dish, with an optical camera system slaved to it, as a backup system in case of failure or heavy EW environment. The barrels of the gun were water-cooled and belt-fed, with each belt containing 550 rounds, but the first round had to be manually chambered. In an emergency, the turret could be manually operated with an optical fire control system. The MR 103 radar system, already outdated when the Parchims were developed, used 1950s-style electromechanical systems, built around vacuum tubes. As a result, it was not considered to be an effective anti-missile system, or CIWS (Close-in weapon system), as was evidenced by a Soviet training accident in 1987 when a test missile drone accidentally locked in on a small Soviet Navy training vessel. Although the ship's AK-725 system kept firing until the moment of impact, no hits were scored and the ship was destroyed by the resulting fire, allegedly killing 39 crew members.

The AK-230 gun was a fully automatic, stabilized, NN-30 double-barrel, water-cooled, four-chamber revolver cannon. The guns had a 1,000 round per minute (rpm) rate of fire and were fed by independent 500 round ammunition belts. The regular associated radar system was the (NATO codename) DRUM TILT radar, which was not used in the Parchim class. According to some sources the AK-230 could not only be linked with the DRUM TILT but also with the MUFF COB radar system, but this is disputed by old East German naval sources. According to these East German sources, the AK-230 gun on the Parchim-class corvette was optically guided, thereby leaving the Parchim class without an effective CIWS, and therefore unable to counter anti-shipping missiles.

There were also two SA-N-5 (Naval SA-7 or Strela II) MANPAD positions aboard the Parchims. But without an effective, radar guided SAM missile system, the Parchims were left completely vulnerable to enemy precision guided anti-shipping weapons. This was a major restriction and confined the Parchims to brown water coastal operations, close to the protective air force and air defence umbrella.

The air search radar was the ubiquitous (NATO codename) STRUT CURVE radar. This radar had a  parabolic radar dish, worked in the F-band frequency, and had a respectable  radar range against aircraft flying at  height, and a less respectable  radar range against surface shipping or low flying aircraft. The electronic defense suite was very basic, and consisted of an IFF (Identification Friend or Foe) receiver and transmitter, and an 'ELOKA' multiband passive RWR antenna slaved to a double 16-cell chaff dispenser.  All in all, air defence — or the lack of one — was a very restrictive factor in the tactical usefulness of the Parchim design.

Anti-submarine warfare

A major evolution over the old HAI III design was the new hydro-acoustic system. The sonar suite consisted of a bow sonar and a variable depth dipping sonar. The sonar screen was panoramic, meaning that it gave a two dimensional radarscope-like view of the surrounding waters. This was a major improvement over the old auditive system in the HAI III class. Another weakness of the old HAI III was its inability to 'see through' water layers with different temperatures. While sound propagates pretty well in water of the same temperature, it gets easily disturbed by even modest differences in water temperature. Especially in the hot summer months these natural occurring phenomena give submarines an easy hide out for probable sub-chasing surface vessels. A solution is the use of a 'dipping sonar', which in a way is nothing more than a small sonar attached to a long cable. By using this device the Parchim's sonar system was able to search the different water layers.

The Parchims were also provided with capable anti-submarine warfare weapons. The  torpedo tubes were loaded with acoustical and/or wire guided torpedoes. This gave the Parchims a precision submarine strike capability. The two RBU-6000 depth charge rocket launchers created a barrier defense against submarines, incoming torpedoes and frogmen. Though relatively unsophisticated by western standards, the RBU-6000 was a very successful and popular system, used on many small or large surface ships. It consisted of a twelve launch tubes for unguided rockets, armed with a compact but powerful depth charge. Rockets were directed by simply changing the angle of the tubes and thereby the ballistics of the unguided rockets. The launcher could elevate between -15° and +60°, and could traverse 180°, with each launcher thus covering one side of the ship. Range was between 350 m and 6000 m, and the charges could reach 500 m deep. The ammunition was swiftly and automatically reloaded from a magazine below deck, by turning the tubes 90° vertically. Maximum magazine capacity was 96 rounds. The whole system was remotely directed by the Burya fire control system. The RBU-6000 could also be used for shore bombardment. The Parchims were also able to simply drop bigger and more powerful depth charges, and could transport and lay up to 60 mines.

Overview 

All in all, the Parchims were up to their task, namely to hunt and destroy enemy submarines in coastal waters. Because of their lack of any real anti-shipping weapons and more importantly because of the absence of a modern air defence capability, their 'blue water' (out of the coastal regions) value would indeed have been slight. This shortcoming was partially offset by Volksmarine doctrine, which regarded the s, equipped with the radar guided OSA/SA-N-4 SAMs, as the cornerstone of their naval blue water air defence. In other words, in order to survive a modern naval war, they had to be escorted by radar guided SAM carriers. But, as the biggest GDR warship building project in history, the Parchim class truly was the "Höhepunkt des DDR-Kampfschiffbaus" ("Highpoint of East German warship construction".)

Ships

The 16 Parchims from the GDR were purchased by Indonesia in 1992 in a deal worth US$12.7 million arranged by then Minister of Research and Technology, B.J. Habibie. The transfer from the Volksmarine also included 14 Frosch-class landing ships and 9 Kondor-class minesweepers.
The Parchims, also known as the Kapitan Pattimura-class underwent a significant rehabilitation which included air-conditioning and engine replacements in 2005.
All the twin 57 mm AK-725 and twin 30 mm AK-230 gun were retained except for KRI Sultan Thaha Syaifuddin (376) & KRI Silas Papare (386) where their 30 mm AK-230 was replaced by Chinese made Type 730 CIWS. Some of the fleets MANPADS, SA-N-5 were also removed and being replaced by either one or two 20 mm autocannon. Similarly, the four 400 mm Russian-made torpedo launcher on some ship were replaced by two Mk 32 triple torpedo launcher.
Currently 14 out of 16 original Parchims were in service with Indonesian navy.
{| class="wikitable"
|-
! style="width:16%" |Name (IDN)
! Hull number (IDN)
! Name (GDR)
! Hull number (GDR)
! style="width:13%" |Commissioned (GDR)
! style="width:13%" |Commissioned (IDN)
! Status
! Notes
|-
|align=left  |
|align=center|371
|align=left  |Prenzlau
|align=center|231
|align=center|11 May 1983
|align=center|23 September 1993
|align=center|Active
|align=left  |
|-
|align=left  |
|align=center|372
|align=left  |Ribnitz
|align=center|233
|align=center|29 October 1983
|align=center|23 September 1993
|align=center|Active
|align=left  |
|-
|align=left  |
|align=center|373
|align=left  |Waren
|align=center|224
|align=center|23 November 1982
|align=center|15 December 1993
|align=center|Active
|align=left  |Initially commissioned as Nuku
|-
|align=left  |
|align=center|374
|align=left  |Angermünde
|align=center|214
|align=center|26 July 1985
|align=center|12 July 1994
|align=center|Active
|align=left  |
|-
|align=left  |
|align=center|375
|align=left  |Lübz
|align=center|221
|align=center|12 February 1982
|align=center|25 February 1994
|align=center|Active
|align=left  |Served briefly in unified German Navy with hull number P 6169|-
|align=left  |
|align=center|376
|align=left  |Bad Doberan|align=center|222
|align=center|30 June 1982
|align=center|25 February 1995
|align=center|Active
|align=left  |
|-
|align=left  |
|align=center|377
|align=left  |Wismar|align=center|241
|align=center|9 July 1981
|align=center|10 March 1995
|align=center|Active
|align=left  |Served briefly in unified German Navy with hull number P 6170
|-
|align=left  |
|align=center|378
|align=left  |Parchim|align=center|242
|align=center|9 April 1981
|align=center|19 September 1994
|align=center|Active
|align=left  |
|-
|align=left  |
|align=center|379
|align=left  |Perleberg|align=center|243
|align=center|19 September 1981
|align=center|19 September 1994
|align=center|Active
|align=left  |
|-
|align=left  |
|align=center|380
|align=left  |Bützow|align=center|244
|align=center|30 December 1981
|align=center|2 June 1995
|align=center|Retired
|align=left  |Caught fire on 18 August 2008, later decommissioned
|-
|align=left  |
|align=center|381
|align=left  |Bergen|align=center|213
|align=center|1 February 1985
|align=center|10 May 1996
|align=center|Active
|align=left  |
|-
|align=left  |
|align=center|382
|align=left  |Güstrow|align=center|223
|align=center|10 November 1982
|align=center|10 May 1996
|align=center|Active
|align=left  |
|-
|align=left  |
|align=center|383
|align=left  |Teterow|align=center|234
|align=center|27 January 1984
|align=center|26 April 1994
|align=center|Active
|align=left  |Served briefly in unified German Navy with hull number P 6168
|-
|align=left  |
|align=center|384
|align=left  |Ludwiglust|align=center|232
|align=center|4 July 1983
|align=center|21 July 1995
|align=center|Retired
|align=left  |Partially sunk after hitting a shipwreck on 13 May 2016, decommissioned on 19 April 2017
|-
|align=left  |
|align=center|385
|align=left  |Grevesmühlen|align=center|212
|align=center|21 September 1984
|align=center|27 October 1996
|align=center|Active
|align=left  |Served briefly in unified German Navy with hull number P 6164
|-
|align=left  |
|align=center|386
|align=left  |Gadebusch|align=center|211
|align=center|31 August 1984
|align=center|27 October 1996
|align=center|Active
|align=left  |Served briefly in unified German Navy with hull number P 6167
|-
|}

Armament:
 1 x twin 57 mm gun AK-725
 1 x twin 30 mm gun AK-230 or 1 x Type 730 CIWS (on two ship, 376 & 386)
 2 x SA-N-5 MANPADS or 2 x 20 mm gun Autocannon (on some ship)
 2 x RBU-6000 ASW rocket launcher
 4 x 400 mm lightweight torpedo tubes or 2 x 324 mm triple Mk 32 torpedo launchers (on some ships)

 Six ships are in service with the Baltic Fleet.

See also
List of ships of the Soviet Navy
List of ships of Russia by project number

References

SourcesConway's All the World's Fighting Ships 1947–1995''

External links

Project 133.1 Parchim class @ FAS.org
Die PARCHIM-Klasse (Projekt 133.1) @ Arcor.de 
Russia / USSR 76 mm/60 (3") AK-176 @ Navweaps
All Parchim Class Corvettes - Complete Ship List @ Russianships.info

Corvette classes
Corvettes of the Volksmarine
Corvettes of the German Navy
Corvettes of the Soviet Navy
Corvettes of the Russian Navy
Corvettes of the Indonesian Navy
Ships built in Wolgast
 
Ships built in East Germany